The Akshaya Patra Foundation is a non-profit trust of International Society for Krishna Consciousness (ISKCON), located in Bangalore, Karnataka, India. The organisation operates the Midday Meal Scheme (a school lunch programme) in India.

Mid Day Meal program 
Akshaya Patra is the largest partner of the Union Government of India to implement the Mid Day Meal scheme in the government run schools of India. The scheme is based on a public-private partnership.

Organisation
APF is run by International Society for Krishna Consciousness (ISKCON), Bangalore. The organisation was established in 2000.

Irregularities in the foundation's workings 
In 2020, four of the independent trustees of APF resigned alleging misuse of funds of the foundation and governance issues in the APF. 
Former Infosys leader T.V. Mohandas Pai; 
advisor to Manipal education and medical group Abhay Jain; 
former Infosys CFO V Balakrishnan and
co-founder of ChrysCapital Raj P. Kondur

These trustees had alleged that the chairman of APF, Madhu Pandit Dasa, and his supporters on the board were targeting the audit committee that was looking into the allegations of the misuse of funds. According to the trustees, the chairman and his supporters were doing this to resist transparency. In the years around 2020, the cost of a meal that APF provided had shot up by at least 5₹ in comparison to the other NGOs. This increase in cost was being investigated.

Other initiatives 
The Akshaya Patra kitchens produce about 350 kilograms of organic waste each day. To reduce the amount of waste going to landfill, the foundation has set up biogas plants in some of its kitchens. This initiative started with the centralized kitchens at Bellary and Vasanthapura (Bengaluru) on Earth Day (April 22) 2016  and now extends to six kitchens across the country. The biogas plants, with a capacity to process 1 tonne per day (TPD) of organic waste, generate 120 to 150 m3 of biogas the equivalent of 30 kilograms of LPG. This gas is consumed in the kitchen's cooking operations and saves APF INR 38,500 per month. This translates to savings of about 10% in total energy consumption required for cooking.

APF has installed of solar photovoltaic (PV) systems at some of its kitchens. Based on the weather these systems produce 80-100 units of electricity per day and this power's the facility's daytime energy requirement e.g. the Bengaluru plant generates 10 kW of power and this is entirely consumed by the facility, whereas the Surat plant generates 12 kW of power with some of the surplus power being fed back to the grid for a credit.

After the COVID-19 lockdown was announced, Akshaypatra began a food program to feed the migrant workers. They provided cooked food as well as dry grocery kits

Awards 
In 2019, APF received the BBC’s Global Food Champion Award.

See also 
 Malnutrition in India 
 List of Indian states by child nutrition

References

External links
 The Akshaya Patra Foundation - Official Website
 Akshaya Patra: A Leader in Battling Classroom Hunger - A case-study on Akshayapatra

Organizations established in 2000
Educational organisations based in India
Children's charities based in India
Organisations based in Bangalore
Recipients of the Rajyotsava Award 2003
Winners of the Nikkei Asia Prize
Recipients of the Gandhi Peace Prize
2000 establishments in Karnataka